Roy Steffensen (born 10 September 1980) is a Norwegian politician for the Progress Party. He was elected to the Parliament of Norway from Rogaland in 2013 where he is a member of the Standing Committee on Transport and Communications.

References 

Progress Party (Norway) politicians
Members of the Storting
Rogaland politicians
1980 births
Living people
21st-century Norwegian politicians